The Castellano is a river in Italy. Its source is in the Monti della Laga mountains near the border between the province of Teramo and the province of Rieti north of Monte Gorzano. It flows northeast through the mountains in the province of Teramo and eventually forms the border between the province of Teramo and the province of Ascoli Piceno. The river flows west of Monte dei Fiori before entering the province of Ascoli Piceno. The river joins the Tronto at Ascoli Piceno.

References

Rivers of the Province of Ascoli Piceno
Rivers of the Province of Teramo
Rivers of Italy
Adriatic Italian coast basins